was the eighth shōgun of the Ashikaga shogunate who reigned from 1449 to 1473 during the Muromachi period of Japan.

Biography 
Yoshimasa was the son of the sixth shōgun Ashikaga Yoshinori. His childhood name was Miharu (三春).  His official wife was Hino Tomiko.

On August 16, 1443 (Kakitsu 3, 21st  day of the 7th month), 10-year-old shōgun Yoshikatsu died of injuries sustained in a fall from a horse.  He had been shōgun for only three years.  Immediately, the bakufu elevated Yoshinari, the young shōgun's even younger brother, to be the new shōgun.  Several years after becoming shōgun, Yoshinari changed his name to Yoshimasa, by which he is better known.

Family
 Father: Ashikaga Yoshinori
 Mother: Hino Shigeko (1411–1463)
 Wife: Hino Tomiko
 Concubine: Oodate Sachiko 
 Children:
 son (b. 1459) by Tomiko
 Ashikaga Yoshihisa by Tomiko
 daughter (1463–1486) by Tomiko
 Koyama Masatoshi (1462–1505) buddhist priest in Keikyoji by Tomiko
 Yuyama Suzho (1455–1532) later Sojiin by Sachiko
 Adopted sons:
 Ashikaga Yoshizumi
 Ashikaga Yoshitane

Shogunal succession
Significant events which shaped the period during which Yoshimasa was shōgun:
 1443 – Southern Court supporters steal the Imperial regalia.
 1445 – Hosokawa Katsumoto, Kyoto kanrei.
 1446 – Southern army suffers crushing defeat.
 1448 – Remnants of Southern dynasty suppressed.
 1449 – Yoshimasa appointed shōgun; Ashikaga Shigeuji appointed Kantō kubō.
 1450–1455 – Disturbances in Kamakura between Kantō kubō Ashikaga Shigeuji and his Kanrei.

Events leading up to civil war

A number of decisions lead eventually to armed conflict:
 1454 – Dissension of Hatakeyama succession.
 1455 – Dissension in Kamakura between Kubō and his Uesugi Kanrei line: "Koga Kubō" (1455–1583) established.
 1457 – "Horikoshi Kubō" (1457–1491) established.
 1458 – Imperial regalia restored to Northern Court.
 1460 – Hatakeyama rebels against Yoshimasa.
 1464 – Yoshimasa adopts Ashikaga Yoshimi.
 1466 – Yoshihisa born; Emperor Go-Tsuchimikado ascends throne.
 1466 – Dissension over Shiba succession.
 1467 – Outbreak of Ōnin War.

Ōnin War
 

By 1464, Yoshimasa had no heir, so he adopted his younger brother, Ashikaga Yoshimi, in order to avoid any conflicts which might arise at the end of his shogunate. However, in the next year, Yoshimasa was surprised by the birth of a son, Ashikaga Yoshihisa. The infant's birth created a conflict between the two brothers over who would follow Yoshimasa as shōgun.  Yoshimasa's wife, Hino Tomiko, attempted to get Yamana Sōzen to support the infant's claim to the shogunate.  By 1467 the simmering dispute had evolved, encouraging a split amongst the powerful daimyōs and clan factions. The armed conflict which ensued has come to be known as the Ōnin War.   This armed contest marks the beginning of the Sengoku period of Japanese history, a troubled period of constant military clashes which lasted over a century. A number of developments affect the unfolding Ōnin War's battles:
 1468 – Yoshimi joins Yamana Sōzen.
 1469 – Yoshihisa appointed heir to shogunate.
 1471 – Asakura Takakage appointed shugo of Echizen Province.
 1473 – Yamana Sōzen and Hosokawa Katsumoto both die.

In the midst of on-going hostilities, Yoshimasa retired in 1473.  He relinquished the position of Sei-i Taishōgun to his young son who became the ninth shōgun Ashikaga Yoshihisa; but effectively, Yoshimasa continued to hold the reins of power. With the leaders of the two warring factions dead and with the ostensible succession dispute resolved, the rationale for continuing to fight faded away.  The exhausted armies dissolved and by 1477 open warfare ended.
 1477 – The Ōnin War is considered at an end.

Yoshimasa's heirs 
When Yoshimasa declared that Yoshihisa would be the next shōgun after he stepped down from that responsibility, he anticipated that his son would out-live him. When shōgun Yoshihisa died prematurely, Yoshimasa reassumed the power and responsibility he had wanted to lay aside. Shōgun Yoshimasa adopted the son of his brother, Yoshimi. In 1489, shōgun Yoshitane was installed; and Yoshimasa retired again.

Before Yoshimasa died in 1490, he again adopted a nephew as heir, this time the son of his brother, Masatomo.  Although Yoshitane did outlive Yoshimasa, his shogunate would prove short-lived. Yoshitane died in 1493.

Also, before he married Hino Tomiko, sister of Hino Katsumitsu, he had a concubine, Lady Oima, who was 8 months pregnant when Tomiko pushed her from the stairs which resulted in a miscarriage.

Shōgun Yoshimasa was succeeded by shōgun Yoshihisa (Yoshimasa's natural son), then by shōgun Yoshitane (Yoshimasa's first adopted son), and then by shōgun Yoshizumi (Yoshimasa's second adopted son). Yoshizumi's progeny would directly succeed him as head of the shogunate. In the future, power struggles from outside the clan would also lead to a brief period in which the great-grandson of Yoshitane would be installed as a puppet leader of the Ashikaga shogunate.

Higashiyama culture

During Yoshimasa's reign Japan saw the growth of the Higashiyama culture (Higashiyama bunka), famous for tea ceremony (Sadō), flower arrangement (Kadō or Ikebana), Noh drama, and Indian ink painting.  Higashiyama culture was greatly influenced by Zen Buddhism and saw the rise of Japanese aesthetics like Wabi-sabi and the harmonization of imperial court (Kuge) and samurai (Bushi) culture.

In the history of this Higashiyama bunka period, a few specific dates are noteworthy:
 1459 (Chōroku 3): Shōgun Yoshimasa provided a new mikoshi and a complete set of robes and other accouterments for this festival on the occasion of repairs to the Atsuta Shrine in the 1457–1459 (Chōroku 1–3).
 1460 (Chōroku 3): Yoshimasa initiated planning for construction of a retirement villa and gardens as early as 1460; and after his death, this property would become a Buddhist temple called Jishō-ji (also known as Ginkaku-ji or the "Silver Pavilion").
 February 21, 1482 (Bummei 14 , 4th day of the 2nd month): Construction of the "Silver Pavilion" is commenced.
 January 27, 1490 (Entoku 2, 7th day of the 1st month):  The former shōgun Yoshimasa died at age 56 in his Higashiyama-dono estate, which marks the beginning of the end of Higashiyama bunka.

Eras of Yoshimasa's bakufu
The years in which Yoshimasa was shōgun are more specifically identified by more than one era name or nengō. 
 Hōtoku (1449–1452)
 Kyōtoku (1452–1455)
 Kōshō (1455–1457)
 Chōroku (1457–1460)
 Kanshō (1460–1466)
 Bunshō (1466–1467)
 Ōnin (1467–1469)
 Bunmei (1469–1487)
 Chōkyō (1487–1489)
 Entoku (1489–1492)

Notes

References 
 Ackroyd, Joyce. (1982) Lessons from History: The Tokushi Yoron. Brisbane: University of Queensland Press.  ;  OCLC 7574544
 Keene, Donald. (2003).  Yoshimasa and the Silver Pavilion: The Creation of the Soul of Japan. New York: Columbia University Press. ; OCLC 52268947
 Titsingh, Isaac. (1834). Nihon Ōdai Ichiran; ou,  Annales des empereurs du Japon.  Paris: Royal Asiatic Society, Oriental Translation Fund of Great Britain and Ireland. OCLC 585069

Ashikaga Yoshihisa
Ashikaga Yoshihisa
Ashikaga Yoshihisa
15th-century shōguns
People of Muromachi-period Japan
Ashikaga Yoshihisa
Yoshimasa
1440s in Japan
1450s in Japan
1460s in Japan
1470s in Japan
1480s in Japan
15th-century Japanese people
15th-century monarchs in Asia